The West Coast Expressway (E32) is an interstate controlled-access highway running along the west coast of Peninsular Malaysia. The  expressway is currently under construction, with several sections open for public use. Once completed, the expressway will run between :Changkat Jering, :Perak and :Banting, :Selangor, following federal routes 5 and 60 for most of its route. The expressway will operate in three sections, with sections of federal route 5 completing the missing connections; these sections will be upgraded to limited-access roads. The expressway is expected to be fully completed by the end of 2024, except for a 10 km stretch from Section 7B which is expected to be completed by June 2026.

The expressway is being built by Konsortium Lebuhraya Pantai Barat. Approval was given by the government for the construction, which was to begin from 20 December 2013 and was to be completed within five years. It originally was given route code E28 but later changed to E32, and E28 was used by Sultan Abdul Halim Muadzam Shah Bridge. The project was delayed and actual construction began in May 2014. Currently, a  segment between Kapar and Bukit Raja, a  segment from Hutan Melintang to Teluk Intan and a  segment from Lekir to Beruas are opened to traffic.

Once the expressway is completed, it will be the fourth longest in Peninsular Malaysia, after the North-South Expressway Northern Route, the East Coast Expressway and the North-South Expressway Southern Route.

Overview
Construction of the expressway is divided into eleven packages. Works for the first five packages commenced in May 2014, of which three packages are in Selangor while the other two are in Perak. The stretches between Tanjung Karang to Hutan Melintang and Teluk Intan to Kampung Lekir are using the existing stretches of federal route 5, both of which are currently being upgraded. As a result, the expressway will consist of three non-contiguous stretches of controlled-access expressway (JKR R6), i.e. from Banting to Tanjung Karang, Hutan Melintang to Teluk Intan and Lekir to Changkat Jering while the two stretches on federal route 5 are partial access highways (JKR R5) featuring grade-separated interchanges at major junctions, left-in/left-out junctions and at-grade U-Turns.

A spur link from Changkat Keruing to Siputeh (near Ipoh) in Perak which will be connected via an interchange with the main link is also in the plan. Construction of the spur link is however deferred. The spur link will consist of a controlled-access expressway (JKR R6) stretch from Changkat Keruing to Parit while the stretch between Parit to Siputeh will use the existing stretch of federal route 73 will be similarly upgraded like the two federal route 5 stretches of the main link package has been awarded to Gedeihen Engineering Sdn Bhd.
The controlled-access expressway stretches will use a closed toll system like the North–South Expressway. Toll collection has started at all opened stretches of the expressway. The stretches on existing federal roads will remain toll-free.

The highway will cost about RM 4.6 billion, where RM3.6 billion will be construction costs. The concessionaire company is planning to issue bonds in 2009.

On 25 May 2014, the construction of the expressway began. The groundbreaking ceremony for the new expressway was held near the Teluk Intan interchange in Teluk Intan, Perak.

Five interchanges (sections 4–5, 8–10) were expected to be opened in time for Eid al-Fitr in 2019 but a burst water pipe on 5 May 2019 delayed the opening of sections 4–5.

On 31 May 2019, section 8 between Hutan Melintang and Teluk Intan in Perak was opened to traffic. The opening ceremony was officiated by the Deputy Minister of Works, Mohd. Anuar Tahir. This followed by the opening of sections 9 and 10 between Lekir and Beruas, also in Perak on 23 September 2019 and officiated by Works Ministry secretary-general Datuk Dr Syed Omar Sharifuddin Syed Ikhsan. The first section to open in Selangor was section 5 between Kapar and Bukit Raja and officiated by Malaysian Highway Authority director-general Datuk Mohd Shuhaimi Hassan. This stretch was opened to public on 10 December 2019.

As of 10 December 2019, the expressway is 71% completed with section 4 (Federal Highway 2–Bandar Bukit Raja (North)) slated to be opened in Q1 2020 followed by sections 1–3 (Banting–Federal Highway 2) & section 6 (Kapar–Assam Jaya) in early 2021. Land acquisition issues and alignment changes causing delay of the construction of section 7 (Assam Jawa–Tanjung Karang), which will be completed by 2024 along with section 11 (Beruas–Taiping South).

WCE group has the first right of refusal for Section 12 (Siputeh – Segari) which will cost RM600 million with 41 km stretch. There is a plan to extend the expressway all the way to Penang if it is feasible.

Route background

The northern terminus of the expressway will be located at Changkat Jering on the North–South Expressway Northern Route. The southern terminus will be located at Banting on Federal Route 31. The expressway will have interchanges to Trong, Beruas, Changkat Cermin, Sitiawan, Lekir, Teluk Intan, Hutan Melintang, Sabak Bernam, Sungai Besar, Sekinchan, Tanjung Karang, Kuala Lumpur–Kuala Selangor Expressway at Assam Jawa, Kapar, New North Klang Straits Bypass, New Klang Valley Expressway at Bukit Raja, Federal Highway at Klang, Sri Andalas, Shah Alam Expressway near Jalan Kebun and South Klang Valley Expressway.

12 sites have been identified as rest and services area with each area will have 2 petrol stations.

Tolls 
The expressway implements closed toll system where rates are calculated between entry and exit of the expressway. However toll collections are not implemented in Federal Route 5 upgraded sections, making the closed toll section divided into three sections, including the short section of Hutan Melintang  - Teluk Intan as well where vehicles still need to go through entry and exit tolls despite not having interchanges in between.

As for now toll collection has begun in all the opened sections.

Toll rates

Junction list

Main Link

Bukit Raja Flyover

References

External links
West Coast Expressway (WCE) Sdn Bhd

2019 establishments in Malaysia
Expressways in Malaysia
Proposed roads in Malaysia